Anarsa or Hilsa is an Indian rice-based biscuit. It is commonly associated with the Hindu festival of Diwali in Maharashtra and Bihar, along with other special occasions.  Its ingredients include jaggery (unrefined cane sugar), rice, poppy seed and ghee (clarified butter).

Preparation
Anarsas are made from soaked powdered rice, jaggery or sugar. To prepare anarsa, rice is soaked and the water is changed regularly for a few days. Then, the rice is drained, ground, and mixed with jaggery to create a dough. The dough is covered and left to mature for 4-5 days. The dough is then rolled in white poppy seeds, pressed into rounds, and fried until golden. The disks are fried poppy-coated side first.

In a variation from the standard recipe, a banana is added to the rice-flour base. The Bihari variation of anarsa tends to be rounder and ball-shaped as opposed to the flatter one in Maharashtra.

References

Indian desserts
Bihari cuisine
Maharashtrian cuisine